Pedro Ribeiro may refer to:

Pedro Ribeiro (footballer, born 1979), Portuguese footballer
Pedro Ribeiro (footballer, born 1983) Portuguese footballer
Pedro Ribeiro (football manager) (born 1985), Portuguese football manager
Pedro Ribeiro (Brazilian footballer) (born 1990), Brazilian footballer
Pedro Ribeiro (footballer, born 1995), Portuguese footballer